Gwen Utz (1900–1979) was an Australian tennis player.

Life
Gwendoline M Chiplin was born in 1900 in New South Wales. She married Harold Utz in 1920. Gwen Utz died in 1979.

Grand slam finals
Gwen Utz reached the final of women's doubles in the inaugural Australian Championship with Floris St. George and they lost to Esna Boyd and Marjorie Mountain 1–6, 6–4, 7–5. She also reached the semifinal in Women's singles in the same year.
Gwen Utz reached the final of women's doubles in the Australian Championship once again in 1931, this time with Nell Lloyd and they lost to Daphne Akhurst Cozens and Louise Bickerton 6–0, 6–4.

References

Australian female tennis players
1900 births
1979 deaths
Tennis people from New South Wales